Jenny Meyer (26 March 1834 – 20 July 1894) was a German operatic alto, mezzo-soprano and music educator as well as director of the Stern Conservatory in Berlin from 1888 until 1894.

Life 
Born in Berlin, Meyer was the daughter of the merchant Itzig Meyer and his wife Wilhelmine. From 1854, she received vocal training from Julius Stern, who had been married to her elder sister Elisabeth (1831–1919) since 1852. She made her debut in 1855 in the oratorio Luther by the composer Julius Schneider and was heard for the first time as a soloist in 1856 at the Gewandhaus in Leipzig. Performances followed in 1857 in Weimar, Hanover, Cologne and Hamburg. She also gave guest performances in Paris and in 1859 she appeared several times in London in court concerts for Queen Victoria.

In 1865, Meyer began working as a singing teacher at the Stern Conservatory. After the death of her brother-in-law Julius Stern in 1883, she became the sole owner and from 1888 director of the Conservatory and led it until her death.

In October 1890, her sister Anna Meyer applied to the Emperor and King for "the title of Professor" to Jenny Meyer. The Minister of Education Gustav von Goßler rejected her request with the remark "that it has not been customary in the Prussian administration up to now to distinguish a female person by the title of professor"; however, he noted that Jenny Meyer "is known as a capable teacher".

Further reading 
 Hermann Mendel and August Reissmann (ed.): Musikalisches Conversations-Lexikon: Eine Encyklopädie der gesammten musikalischen Wissenschaften. Seventh volume, Robert Oppenheim, Berlin 1877, 
 Hugo Riemann: Riemann Musiklexikon. 7th edition. Max Hesse Verlag, Leipzig 1909, 
 Oscar Paul (ed.): Handlexikon der Tonkunst. Second volume (L–Z), Heinrich Schmidt, Leipzig 1873, 
 Cordula Heymann-Wentzel: Das Stern’sche Konservatorium der Musik in Berlin. Rekonstruktion einer verdrängten Geschichte. Dissertation UDK Berlin, 2010, Online-Publikation 2014, especially , Online at University der Kunst

References

Note

External links 
 
 Meyer Jenny on Operissimo
 Die Arä Jenny Meyer at Stern Conservatory, Berlin University of the Arts online.

German operatic mezzo-sopranos
German music educators
1834 births
1894 deaths
Musicians from Berlin